Milan Lazarevski (born 9 February 1997) is a Macedonian handball player for RK Vardar 1961 and the Macedonian national team.

He participated at the 2017 Men's Junior World Handball Championship.

References

1997 births
Living people
Macedonian male handball players
Sportspeople from Skopje
Mediterranean Games competitors for North Macedonia
Competitors at the 2018 Mediterranean Games